Alternative Socialist Alliance – Independents (in Bulgarian: Алтернативно социалистическо обединение – независими) is  a political party in Bulgaria, which emerged from a minority fraction of the Bulgarian Communist Party. The party was first registered as a political party in 1991.

In 1996, under the name Alternative Socialist Alliance it launched its party president Lyubomir Stefanov as a presidential candidate. Stefanov got 0.16% of the votes.

In 1998 the party joined the Bulgarian Euro-Left. In 2001 it was reconstructed as an independent party, and registered with the current name. The party did not put up any own lists for the 2001 elections.

Socialist parties in Bulgaria